Zhongshan Park is the name of an interchange station between Lines 2, 3 and 4 on the Shanghai Metro, named after Shanghai's largest commercial park which is located nearby. This station served as the western terminus of Line 2 from the line's opening on 20 September 1999 until the first westward extension to  opened on 30 December 2006. The interchanges with Lines 3 and 4 opened on 27 December 2000 and the final day of 2005, respectively, and are part of both lines' initial sections.
Immediately to the northeast of the station is the Cloud Nine shopping mall, visible from the elevated Lines 3 and 4.

Station Layout

Places nearby
Zhongshan Park
Cloud Nine shopping mall
East China Normal University
East China University of Science and Technology
Suzhou Creek, crossed by Lines 3 and 4 just north of Zhongshan Park

References

Shanghai Metro stations in Changning District
Line 2, Shanghai Metro
Line 3, Shanghai Metro
Line 4, Shanghai Metro
Railway stations in China opened in 1999
Railway stations in Shanghai